The Bank of India was a bank founded in the year 1828 in British India. The bank was the thirteenth oldest bank in India. It closed down in 1829.

History

Founding  
Raj Kissen Dutt founded the bank in 1828. It closed down in 1829. The bank played a major role in the early economic history of East Bengal and Bangladesh.

Fate  
The bank issued its own currency notes in its one year of existence.
However, many of the currency notes issued by the bank were found to have been forged.

The bank closed and was liquidated in 1829.

Legacy 
The bank is notable for being the thirteenth oldest bank in India. It is also notable for being one of the first institutions in India to issue its own paper banknotes or currency notes. The Paper Currency Act, 1861, abolished the right of private banks to issue their own currency notes.

See also

Indian banking
List of banks in India
List of oldest banks in India

References

External links
 Oldest Banks in India
 Banking in India

Defunct banks of India
Companies based in Kolkata
Banks established in 1828